The 2023 Collingwood Football Club season is the club's 127th season of senior competition in the Australian Football League (AFL). The club also fielded its reserves team in the Victorian Football League and women's teams in the AFL Women's and VFL Women's competitions. Prior to the season, Scott Pendlebury stepped down as captain after nine years as skipper.

Overview

Squad
 Players are listed by guernsey number, and 2023 statistics are for AFL regular season and finals series matches during the 2023 AFL season only. Career statistics include a player's complete AFL career, which, as a result, means that a player's debut and part or whole of their career statistics may be for another club. Statistics are correct as of the 2nd Preliminary final of the 2022 season (17 September 2022) and are taken from AFL Tables.

Squad changes

In

Out

AFL season

Pre-season matches

Regular season

Ladder

Awards & Milestones

Milestones
 Round 1 – Bobby Hill (Collingwood debut)
 Round 1 – Daniel McStay (Collingwood debut)
 Round 1 – Tom Mitchell (Collingwood debut)

VFL season

Pre-season matches

Regular season

Ladder

AFLW season

Pre-season matches

Regular season

Ladder

Squad
 Players are listed by guernsey number, and 2023 statistics are for AFL Women's regular season and finals series matches during the 2023 AFL Women's season only. Career statistics include a player's complete AFL Women's career, which, as a result, means that a player's debut and part or whole of their career statistics may be for another club. Statistics are correct as of the Semi-final of the AFL Women's season seven (12 November 2022) and are taken from Australian Football.

Squad changes
In

Out

League awards

Club Awards

VFLW season

Pre-season matches

Regular season

Ladder

Notes
 Key
 H ^ Home match.
 A ^ Away match.

 Notes
Collingwood's scores are indicated in bold font.
Match was played over 4 quarters of 25 minutes each.

References

External links
 Official website of the Collingwood Football Club
 Official website of the Australian Football League

2023
Collingwood Football Club
Collingwood